Staffan Widstrand (born 1959) is a Swedish photographer and author based in Stockholm, Sweden.

Career
Widstrand was born in Sweden in 1959. Prior to becoming a professional photographer in the mid-1980's, Widstrand worked in the metal industry as well as worked as a nature tour guide. Later, he also served as an reserved officer in the Swedish Armoured Troops Corps. In 1984, he founded his photography company Staffan Widstrand Photography in Järfälla, Stockholm. Between 1984 and 1990, Widstrand worked as a picture editor at Natur & Kultur. He specializes in storytelling about the natural world and nature conservation issues, using writing and wildlife photography. Widstrand's work underlines the sheer joy of our planet's natural heritage as to inspire wide audiences to protect and take better care of it. He is a National Geographic Explorer since 2008 and a Sony Imaging Brand Ambassador since 2020. Between 1997 and 2020, Widstrand served as a brand ambassador for Nikon.

In 1993, Widstrand co-authored his first book Safari till världens finaste viltområden - Ecotouring: the Ultimate Guide with Magnus Elander. Widstrand has authored 20 books in 10 languages and has been awarded with the Årets Pandabok -WWF Sweden prize five times.

In 1996, Widstrand was awarded his first Wildlife Photographer of the Year award, staged by the Natural History Museum, London. Since then, he has received Wildlife Photographer of the Year awards 11 times. In 2001, Widstrand was bestowed with the Årets Naturfotograf i Sverige (Swedish Nature Photographer of the Year) title. He has also had five awarded images in the European Nature Photographer of the Year (GDT) awards, since 2003. Outdoor Photographer in 2010 called Widstrand one of the World's 40 Most influential nature photographers. 

Widstrand is a Founding Fellow of the International League of Conservation Photographers (ILCP) since 2005, and the first Swede to be elected into it. Apart from that, he has initiated and co-founded several long-term nature conservation communication and media projects, such as the Wild Wonders of Europe, Wild Wonders of China, Rewilding Europe, the Swedish Ecotourism Association, Scandinavian Big Five Predators project and Deforestationsweden.org. He is the managing director and co-owner of Wild Wonders International AB, and co-owner of the nature photography travel agency Wild Nature Photo Adventures.

Widstrand has served as a judge in several international photo competitions including World Press Photo, Wildlife Photographer of the Year, Golden Turtle (Russia), European Nature Photographer of the Year-GDT (Germany), Xishuangbanna Biennal (China) and Humanity Photo Awards (China). He has also had his work exhibited worldwide.

Bibliography 

Source: - Published books

Prizes and awards 

Source: - List of awards

References

External links 
Official website

Living people
Nature photographers
1959 births
20th-century Swedish photographers
Swedish-language writers
21st-century Swedish male writers
20th-century Swedish male writers
21st-century Swedish photographers